The 1934 Montana Grizzlies football team represented the University of Montana in the 1934 college football season as a member of the Pacific Coast Conference (PCC). The Grizzlies were led by fourth-year head coach Bunny Oakes, played their home games at Dornblaser Field and finished the season with a record of two wins, five losses and one tie (2–5–1, 0–4–1 PCC).

Schedule

References

Montana
Montana Grizzlies football seasons
Montana Grizzlies football